Death Equinox was a series of four conventions held in Denver, Colorado in the late 1990s and early 2000s. Sponsored by CyberPsychos AOD, and organized by Jasmine Sailing, they focused on alternative culture and art. A usual aspect was that they combined both the transgressive aspects of writing and art with the actual practice of things that would appear in such works. Convention events included standards such as readings and panels but also featured live concerts, play piercing demonstrations, torture readings and Cnidarian sermons. Rev. Ivan Stang hosted a Church of the SubGenius devival at the second Death Equinox convention.

Death Equinox '97
 General GoH: John Shirley
 Sado-Magickal GoH: Don Webb
 Horrific Literatist GoH: Brian Hodge
 Master of Toast: Edward Bryant

Death Equinox '98
Specialized Guests of Honour:
 Slack-Magickal GoH: Rev. Ivan Stang
 Master of Toast: Lee Ballentine
Ranchhand Guests of Honour:
 Audial Distortionist GoH: Little Fyodor
 Visual Depictionist GoH: T. Motley
 Veteran Guests: Don Webb, Brian Hodge, and Edward Bryant

Death Equinox '99
 General GoH: Larry McCaffery
 Master of Oration: R. N. Taylor
 Kink-Artist GoH: Gomez
 Mad Scientist GoH: Bill Llewellin
 Veteran Guests: Brian Hodge, Edward Bryant, Lee Ballentine, Little Fyodor, and T. Motley

Death Equinox '01
Guests of Honour:
 Avant-Prof GoH: Lance Olsen
 Visual Depictionist GoH: Andi Olsen
 Horrific Literatist GoH: Brian Evenson
 Master of Crack-Toast: Michael Hemmingson
 Veteran Guests: Larry McCaffery, R. N. Taylor, Edward Bryant, Lee Ballentine, Little Fyodor, T. Motley, and Gomez.

Other known participants (all years)
 Jasmine Sailing
 Bruce Young
 M. Christian (Eros Ex Machina)
 Thomas Roche (Noirotica)
 Paula Guran, (Dark Echo/Wet Bones)
 Julia Solis (Spitting Image)
 Greg Bishop (The Excluded Middle)
 Jeffrey A. Stadt (Bloodrealms)
 Doug Rice
 Rob Hardin
 Loren Rhoads (Morbid Curiosity)
 Schwann
 Trace Reddell
 Gregory R. Hyde
 Trey R. Barker
 Christopher Morris*
 Travis Fendle
 Gene Santagada
 Arkoff Kapacitor
 John Kerper
 Claudius Reich
 Judy Saxe
 Darlene Sexauer
 John Niernberger
 Chris Yardley (Tantric Lobotomy Commission)
 Gordon Klock
 Alex Seminara

References

External links
 DE Home Page
 Cnidarian Home Page
 Wired Article

Defunct multigenre conventions
Conventions in Denver
1990s in Denver
2000s in Denver